Rehwinkel Hall, originally known as the West Dormitory, was completed in 1916 as a three-story building with raised basement, facing south on the former St. John's College (Kansas) campus.   It was listed on the National Register of Historic Places as West Dormitory-St. John's College  in 1991.

See also 

 Baden Hall
 Mundinger Hall

References

Residential buildings on the National Register of Historic Places in Kansas
Neoclassical architecture in Kansas
Buildings and structures completed in 1915
Cowley County, Kansas
University and college buildings on the National Register of Historic Places in Kansas